Shimmer Women Athletes (often referred to and stylized as SHIMMER) is an American, Chicago-based independent women's professional wrestling promotion which held its first event on November 6, 2005. Established by Dave Prazak and run by both him and Allison Danger, the promotion was created to give female wrestling talent from North America and beyond a serious, non-objectifying platform on which to display their skills.

The company takes a unique approach to staging its live events: Shimmer runs one large show every three months (on average) at the Eagles Club in Berwyn, Illinois. Two DVDs worth of material are taped at each of these super-shows, and are sold as single volumes—initially through Ring of Honor's online store, before being nationally distributed through retail outlets. Due to Prazak's prior work with Ring of Honor, the two companies are closely affiliated, with ROH promoting Shimmer by periodically featuring its performers on ROH pre- and main-show cards. In September 2008, Shimmer announced it would start its own wrestling school for female athletes.

Ring of Honor previously recognized the Shimmer Championship and the Shimmer Tag Team Championship; both of which have even been defended at ROH events. Its former sister promotion Full Impact Pro also recognized the titles and had defenses of them at its events.

Shimmer's sister promotions include Shine Wrestling, a WWNLive brand which debuted on July 20, 2012, and Rise Wrestling, which was originally founded in 2016 as a developmental program.

Championships 

Volumes

References

External links 

 Official Shimmer website

 
Independent professional wrestling promotions based in the Midwestern United States
Women's professional wrestling promotions
Ring of Honor
2005 establishments in Illinois